Convolvulus althaeoides is a species of morning glory known by the common names mallow bindweed and mallow-leaved bindweed. This flowering plant is native to the Mediterranean Basin, but it is occasionally seen in other areas of similar climate, such as California in the United States, where it has been introduced. This is a climbing perennial plant with solitary flowers on long peduncles. The flower is a funnel-shaped pink bloom 3 or 4 centimeters wide. The leaves are deeply divided into narrow, fingerlike lobes.

References

External links

Jepson Manual Treatment
Photo gallery

althaeoides
Flora of Greece
Plants described in 1753
Taxa named by Carl Linnaeus
Flora of Malta